Terry Hudson is a paralympic athlete from Great Britain competing mainly in category C1 events.

Terry competed in the 1984 Summer Paralympics in athletics and boccia. In Athletics, he won a bronze medal in Men's Slalom C1. In Boccia, he won another bronze medal in the Men's Individual C1 event.

He also competed in track athletics in the 1988 Summer Paralympics and won silver in his only event that year, the Men's Slalom C1, his best result at a Games.

References

Year of birth missing (living people)
Living people
Paralympic athletes of Great Britain
Paralympic boccia players of Great Britain
Paralympic silver medalists for Great Britain
Paralympic bronze medalists for Great Britain
Paralympic medalists in athletics (track and field)
Paralympic medalists in boccia
Athletes (track and field) at the 1984 Summer Paralympics
Athletes (track and field) at the 1988 Summer Paralympics
Boccia players at the 1984 Summer Paralympics
Medalists at the 1984 Summer Paralympics
Medalists at the 1988 Summer Paralympics